JGHS may refer to:

 James Gillespie's High School, Edinburgh, Scotland
 John Gray High School, George Town, Grand Cayman, Cayman Islands
 John Glenn High School (disambiguation)
 Taipei Municipal Jianguo High School, Taipei, Taiwan

See also

JGH (disambiguation)